SS Volo was a British steam cargo ship that was built on Tyneside in 1938 and sunk by a German U-boat in the Mediterranean Sea off North Africa in 1941. 23 people on board the Volo died as a result of the attack.

Building
Volo was completed in April 1938. Ellerman's registered both ships in Hull. The line named Volo after the port of Volos in Thessaly, Greece, which is one of many Mediterranean ports with which the company traded.

The boilers fed a three-cylinder triple expansion steam engine that in turn exhausted into a low-pressure steam turbine. The turbine had double-reduction gearing, the two engines drove a single screw, and their combined power output was rated at 335 NHP.

Career and sinking
In the Second World War Volo served in a number of convoys, starting in September and October 1939 with two round trips between the Bristol Channel and the Loire. From November 1939 until May 1940 she made four round trips between Liverpool and Gibraltar, then in June 1940 she sailed from the Dardanelles to Port Said. From August 1940 until December 1941 she operated from ports in Egypt to support UK and Allied forces in the Siege of Malta and the Battle of Greece.

In December 1941 Volo was a member of Convoy ME-8 from Malta to Alexandria. Her Master was George Ronald Whitfield, MBE. Early on the morning of 28 December the  attacked the convoy. Captain Whitfield, 20 crew members and three DEMS gunners were killed. Nine crew members and five DEMS gunners survived, were rescued by the Royal Navy Landing Ship, Tank HMS LCT-11 and taken to Alexandria.

After two and a half hours Kipling sank the U-boat with depth charges, killing 14 of her 44 crew.

References

Ships of the Ellerman Lines
1938 ships
Maritime incidents in December 1941
Ships built by Swan Hunter
Ships sunk by German submarines in World War II
Steamships of the United Kingdom
Ships built on the River Tyne
World War II merchant ships of the United Kingdom
World War II shipwrecks in the Mediterranean Sea